Queen City is a city in Cass County, Texas, United States. The population was 1,476 as of the 2010 census; in 2020, its population was 1,397.

Geography

Queen City is located in northeastern Cass County at  (33.153186, –94.155343). It is bordered to the south by the city of Atlanta. U.S. Route 59 passes through Queen City, leading north  to Texarkana and south into Atlanta.

Demographics

As of the 2020 United States census, there were 1,397 people, 594 households, and 389 families residing in the city.

As of the census of 2000, there were 1,613 people, 660 households, and 440 families residing in the city. The population density was 451.1 people per square mile (174.0/km2). There were 763 housing units at an average density of 213.4 per square mile (82.3/km2). The racial makeup of the city was 82.27% White, 14.45% African American, 0.81% Native American, 0.19% Asian, 0.68% from other races, and 1.61% from two or more races. Hispanic or Latino of any race were 1.92% of the population.

There were 660 households, out of which 33.5% had children under the age of 18 living with them, 47.9% were married couples living together, 15.3% had a female householder with no husband present, and 33.2% were non-families. 30.0% of all households were made up of individuals, and 14.5% had someone living alone who was 65 years of age or older. The average household size was 2.44 and the average family size was 3.03.

In the city, the population was spread out, with 27.1% under the age of 18, 8.9% from 18 to 24, 28.7% from 25 to 44, 21.6% from 45 to 64, and 13.8% who were 65 years of age or older. The median age was 36 years. For every 100 females, there were 83.5 males. For every 100 females age 18 and over, there were 78.7 males.

The median income for a household in the city was $26,058, and the median income for a family was $36,389. Males had a median income of $27,031 versus $18,250 for females. The per capita income for the city was $13,492. About 17.7% of families and 19.6% of the population were below the poverty line, including 25.1% of those under age 18 and 19.5% of those age 65 or over.
Hans Anderson is the city's water supervisor.

Education
Queen City is served by the Queen City Independent School District and is home to the Queen City Bulldogs.

See also

 List of cities in Texas

References

External links

 

 

Cities in Cass County, Texas
Cities in Texas